Vančo Micevski (born 28 August 1971) is a former Macedonian professional footballer who played as a striker. Since January 2022 he is the Director of Sports of Pelister. Born in SFR Yugoslavia, he represented the Macedonia national team internationally.

Club career
Micevski was born in Skopje, SFR Yugoslavia. He began his career with Rabotnichki. The following years he moved to Pelister and Sileks where he had his most successful spell as a player. Micevski has scored 128 goals in Macedonian first league and he is second top scorer in the history of Macedonian League

In the 1996–97 season he was playing his club football for Sileks Kratovo, and was transferred in the winter break to KV Mechelen in Belgium. Following a short spell with Union Berlin he returned by the 1999–2000 season to be playing back in Macedonia for Pelister and scored a goal in their cup final victory over Sloga Jugomagnat. Later on his career he went on to play for Madžari before finishing his playing career with Pelister in 2007.

International career
Micevski made eight international appearances for the Macedonia national team between October 1993 and June 1997. He scored four international goals during his international career against Albania, Liechtenstein and Malta.

Career statistics
Scores and results list Macedonia's goal tally first, score column indicates score after each Micevski goal.

Honours
Macedonian First League: 1995–96, 1996–97
Macedonian Cup: 1996–97, 2000–01
Macedonian Republic Cup: 1990-91
Macedonian First League Top Scorer: 1996–97

References

External links
 Profile at MacedonianFootball.com 
 

1971 births
Living people
Footballers from Skopje
Association football forwards
Yugoslav footballers
Macedonian footballers
North Macedonia international footballers
FK Rabotnički players
FK Pelister players
FK Sileks players
K.V. Mechelen players
1. FC Union Berlin players
FK Pobeda players
FK Madžari Solidarnost players
Yugoslav Second League players
Yugoslav First League players
Macedonian First Football League players
Belgian Pro League players
Challenger Pro League players
Regionalliga players
Macedonian expatriate footballers
Expatriate footballers in Belgium
Macedonian expatriate sportspeople in Belgium
Expatriate footballers in Germany
Macedonian expatriate sportspeople in Germany